The Vienna is a historic apartment building located at Indianapolis, Indiana.  It was built in 1908, and is a three-story, nine bay by seven bay, Classical Revival style yellow brick and grey limestone building.  It sits on a rusticated raised basement and has six Tuscan order pilasters. It features projecting pedimented corner pavilions.

It was listed on the National Register of Historic Places in 1983.

References

Apartment buildings in Indiana
Residential buildings on the National Register of Historic Places in Indiana
Neoclassical architecture in Indiana
Residential buildings completed in 1908
Residential buildings in Indianapolis
National Register of Historic Places in Indianapolis
1908 establishments in Indiana